Juanacatlán is a metro station on the Mexico City Metro. It is located in Mexico City's  Miguel Hidalgo borough in the San Miguel Chapultepec  neighborhood, and lies on Line 1 of the Metro. In 2019 the station had an average ridership of 11,669 passengers per day, making it the least used station in Line 1.

Name and pictogram
When the station opened in 1970, it was originally named for the street that was in front of the station, Juanacatlán (the name of the street changed and it is now known as Alfonso Reyes, in honor of the Mexican writer, philosopher and diplomat).

The street was in turn named for Juanacatlán in the state of Jalisco. Xonacatlan, means "place of onions" (sometimes mistakenly read as meaning "place of butterflies") in Nahuatl. Therefore, the station's pictogram depicts a butterfly.

General information
The station was opened on 11 April 1970.

The station's building also contains the offices of the Metro workers' trade union, the windows of which depict the front of a metro train. This station runs under Avenida Pedro Antonio de los Santos. It serves the San Miguel Chapultepec and Condesa districts.

From 23 April to 23 June 2020, the station was temporarily closed due to the COVID-19 pandemic in Mexico.

Ridership

Entrances
Northeast: Av. Pedro Antonio de los Santos, San Miguel Chapultepec
East: Circuito Interior Maestro José Vasconcelos, San Miguel Chapultepec
Southwest: Av. Pedro Antonio de los Santos, San Miguel Chapultepec

Gallery

References

External links 
 

Mexico City Metro Line 1 stations
Railway stations opened in 1970
1970 establishments in Mexico
Mexico City Metro stations in Miguel Hidalgo, Mexico City
Accessible Mexico City Metro stations